Townsendiella is a genus of cuckoo bees in the family Apidae, found in Central America, Mexico, and the southwestern United States. It is the sole genus of the tribe Townsendiellini.

Species
 Townsendiella californica Michener, 1936
 Townsendiella ensifera Orr and Griswold, 2015
 Townsendiella pulchra Crawford, 1916
 Townsendiella rufiventris Linsley, 1942

References

 Michener, Charles D. (2000). The Bees of the World, xiv + 913.
 Michener, Charles D. (2007). The Bees of the World, Second Edition, xvi + 953.

Further reading

External links

 NCBI Taxonomy Browser, Townsendiella

Nomadinae